In music, Op. 41 stands for Opus number 41. Compositions that are assigned this number include:

 York Bowen – Fantasy and Quartet, Op. 41 No. 1 (for 4 violas) and No. 2 (for standard string quartet)
 Brahms – 5 Lieder, Op. 41 (for male chorus)
 Busoni – Turandot Suite
 Chopin – Mazurkas, Op. 41
 Elgar – In the Dawn and Speak, Music!
 Mendelssohn – 6 Lieder, Op. 41 (SATB chorus or 4 solo voices)
 Nielsen – Moderen
 Ludolf Nielsen – String Quartet No. 3
 Pierné – 
 Prokofiev – Le pas d'acier
 Rachmaninoff – Three Russian Songs, Op. 41
 Rimsky-Korsakov – 4 Romances, Op. 41
 Saint-Saëns – Piano Quartet in B major
 Schoenberg – Ode to Napoleon Buonaparte for voice, piano and string quartet, Op. 41
 Schumann – Three String Quartets
 Scriabin – Poème, Op. 41
 Sibelius – Kyllikki
 Smirnov – Tiriel
 R. Strauss – 5 Lieder, Op. 41
 Tchaikovsky – Liturgy of St. John Chrysostom